Stigmella fumida is a moth of the family Nepticulidae. It is found in Japan (Tsushima, possibly Kyushu), North Korea and China (Yunnan).

The wingspan is 5.2-6.1 mm. Larvae have been found in October and adults were reared from February to May, one adult was collected in July in Korea. There are probably at least two generations per year.

The larvae feed on Quercus acutissima, Quercus variabilis and possibly also on Castanea crenata. They mine the leaves of their host plant. The mine consists of a sinuous gallery throughout, first with narrow brown linear frass, mostly filling about one third of the mine, but sometimes filling it completely. In the final instar the frass is broadly dispersed, or coiled and black.

External links
Nepticulidae (Lepidoptera) in China, 1. Introduction and Stigmella (Schrank) feeding on Fagaceae

Nepticulidae
Moths of Asia
Moths described in 1985